The Nissan Bassara is a minivan/MPV manufactured from November 1999 to June 2003 by Nissan. The name is derived from the Sanskrit word "Vajara", which means "the prize or object of desire that encourages someone to yield to temptation." The Bassara competed with the Honda Odyssey (Japan-spec) and the Toyota Gaia. It shared a platform with the Nissan Gloria, the Nissan Presage, and the Nissan R'nessa. The Bassara was exclusive to Japanese Nissan dealerships called Nissan Prince Store locations, and discontinued when Nissan combined their five Japanese dealership networks into two sales chains, and Prince locations were renamed Nissan Red Stage.

A trim level called the Axis was offered with a performance image. Other trim levels were offered called J, J Splendens, Highway Star, V, V touring, X, X Leather Package, Luxury Package X, and the X Touring.

References
 Nissan BASARA (May-August 2001)  - Nissan Bassara (Japanese)
 Nissan BASARA (August 2001 -2003 June)  - Nissan Bassara (Japanese)

Minivans
Bassara
1990s cars
2000s cars